Gustavo Henrique Alves Silva (born 12 March 2000), known as Gustavo Nescau or simply Gustavo, is a Brazilian professional footballer who plays as a forward for Albirex Niigata.

Club career
Born in Piracicaba, São Paulo, Gustavo only joined a youth setup in 2019 with Rio Claro, at the age of 19. He was subsequently invited to join the under-20 side of Marília, where he impressed and was promoted to the main squad for the 2020 season.

Gustavo made his senior debut on 2 October 2020, coming on as a late substitute in a 1–1 Campeonato Paulista Série A3 home draw against Desportivo Brasil. In the 2020 Copa Paulista, he became a regular starter, scoring eight goals and being the competition's top goalscorer as his side reached the Finals.

After a frustrated negotiation with an Emirati club, Gustavo was again Marília's top scorer in the 2021 Paulista Série A3, with seven goals. On 3 June 2021, he moved to Série A side Cuiabá on loan until December.

On 17 September 2021, after impressing with the under-23 side, Gustavo signed a permanent three-year contract with the Dourado. He made his top flight debut three days later, replacing Rafael Elias in a 2–2 home draw against Fluminense.

On 14 January 2023, Nescau announcement officially signing transfer to J1 promoted club, Albirex Niigata for ahead of 2023 season.

Career statistics

Club 

.

References

External links

2000 births
Living people
People from Piracicaba
Brazilian footballers
Association football forwards
Brazilian expatriate sportspeople in Japan
Campeonato Brasileiro Série A players
J1 League players
Marília Atlético Clube players
Cuiabá Esporte Clube players
Esporte Clube Santo André players
Albirex Niigata players
Footballers from São Paulo (state)